St. Mary's Cathedral, Tallinn (full name: Tallinna Püha Neitsi Maarja Piiskoplik Toomkirik, also known as Dome Church) is a cathedral church located on Toompea Hill in Tallinn, Estonia. Originally established by Danes in the 13th century, it is the oldest church in Tallinn and mainland Estonia. It is also the only building in Toompea which survived a 17th-century fire.

Originally a Roman Catholic cathedral, it became Lutheran in 1561 and now belongs to the Estonian Evangelical Lutheran Church. It is the seat of the Archbishop of Tallinn, the spiritual leader of the Estonian Evangelical Lutheran Church, and chairman of that church's governing synod.

History 

The first church was made of wood most likely already and built by 1219, when the Danes invaded Tallinn. In 1229, when the Dominican friars arrived, they started building a stone church replacing the old wooden one. The monks were killed in a conflict between the Knights of the Sword and vassals supporting the pope's legate in 1233, and the church was thus desecrated. A letter asking permission to consecrate it anew was sent to Rome in 1233, and this is the first record of the church's existence.

The Dominicans could not finish the building and built only the base walls. The building was completed in 1240, and it was a one-aisled building with a rectangular chancel.

In 1240, it was also named cathedral and consecrated in honour of the Virgin Mary. In the beginning of the 14th century, reconstruction of the church began. The church was made bigger. The reconstruction began with building a new chancel. At about the same time, the new vestry was built.

The enlargement of the one-aisled building to a three-aisled building began in the 1330s. The construction work, however, lasted almost 100 years. The new longitudinal part of the church, 29 meters long, built by following the principles of basilica, was completed in the 1430s. The nave's rectangular pillars had been completed in the second half of the 14th century, though.

The church suffered considerable damage in the great fire of 1684 when the entire wooden furnishings were destroyed. Some vaults collapsed and many stone-carved details were severely damaged – especially in the chancel.

In 1686, after the fire, the church was practically rebuilt to restore it to its previous state. The new pulpit with figures of the apostles (1686) and the altarpiece (1696) were made by the Estonian sculptor and carver Christian Ackermann.

The Dome Church's exterior dates from the 15th century, the spire dates from the 18th century. Most of the church's furnishings go back to the 17th and 18th centuries. From 1778 to 1779, a new baroque spire was built in the western part of the nave.

One should also mention the numerous different kinds of tombstones from the 13th–18th centuries, the stone-carved sarcophagi from the 17th century, also the altar and chancel, chandeliers, numerous coats of arms from the 17th–20th centuries. Two of the church's four bells date back to 17th century, two date to the 18th century. The organ was made in 1914.

Among the people buried in the cathedral are the Bohemian nobleman Jindřich Matyáš Thurn, one of leaders of the Protestant revolt against Emperor Ferdinand II and in events that led to the Thirty Years' War; the Swedish soldier Pontus De la Gardie and his wife, Sofia Johansdotter Gyllenhielm (John III's daughter); as well as the Scotsman Samuel Greig (formerly Samuil Karlovich Greig of the Russian Navy); the Swedish field marshals and cousins Otto Wilhelm and Fabian von Fersen; and the Russian navigator, Adam Johann von Krusenstern.

Gallery

See also 

 List of cathedrals in Estonia
 Toompea
 Tallinn

References 

Churches in Tallinn
Lutheran cathedrals
Lutheran churches in Estonia
Cathedrals in Estonia
Gothic architecture in Estonia
13th-century establishments in Estonia
13th-century churches in Estonia
Pre-Reformation Roman Catholic cathedrals
Tallinn Old Town